"Sundown" is a song by British pop group S Club 8, released as the second single and title track from their album of the same name Sundown. Released on 29 September 2003, the single peaked at number four on the UK Singles Chart.

Song information

Calvin Goldspink sings backing vocals in the song's intro, a line and backing vocals in the first part of the bridge, a line in the second part of the bridge along with Stacey, and backing vocals in the final chorus. Stacey McClean sings the first and third verses, backing vocals in the second and final chorus, the second part of the bridge including a line along with Calvin, and backing vocals in the end of the song. Frankie Sandford sings the second and fourth verses, and backing vocals in the second chorus. Aaron Renfree, Rochelle Wiseman, Daisy Evans, Hannah Richings and Jay Asforis do not have any vocal lines in this song.

Track listings
UK CD1
 "Sundown"
 "The Day You Came"
 "Don't Stop Moving 'til Sundown" (Bimbo Jones Bootie remix)
 "Sundown" (video)

UK CD2
 "Sundown"
 "Wherever Your Heart Beats"
 "Sundown" (Almighty mix)

UK cassette single
 "Sundown"
 "The Day You Came"
 "Don't Stop Moving 'til Sundown" (Bimbo Jones Bootie remix)

Credits and personnel
Credits are lifted from the UK CD1 liner notes.

Studios
 Recorded at RedFly Studios and (Sweden) and Strongroom Studios (London, England)
 Mixed at RedFly Studios and (Sweden)
 Mastered at Transfermation (London, England)

Personnel
 Twin – production
 Niclas Molinder – writing
 Joacim Persson – writing
 Pelle Ankarberg – writing, co-production
 Andreas Mattsson – writing
 Richard Dowling – mastering

Charts

Weekly charts

Year-end charts

References

2003 singles
2003 songs
Polydor Records singles
S Club 8 songs
Songs written by Joacim Persson
Songs written by Niclas Molinder